UFC on Fox: Johnson vs. Bader (also known as UFC on Fox 18) was a mixed martial arts event held on January 30, 2016, at the Prudential Center in Newark, New Jersey.

Background
The event was headlined by a potential UFC Light Heavyweight Championship title eliminator bout between Anthony Johnson and The Ultimate Fighter: Team Nogueira vs. Team Mir winner Ryan Bader.

A welterweight bout between former Strikeforce Welterweight Champion Tarec Saffiedine and Jake Ellenberger was originally booked as the main event of UFC Fight Night: Saffiedine vs. Lim on January 4, 2014 and later as part of UFC 172 on April 26, 2014. However, the bout was cancelled both times due to Ellenberger having a hamstring injury  and Saffiedine pulling out due to an undisclosed injury, respectively. The fight was later rescheduled for this event.

Joaquim Silva was expected to face Olivier Aubin-Mercier at this event. However, on December 23, Silva was forced to pull out due to injury and was replaced by Carlos Diego Ferreira.

Andrew Holbrook was expected to face Sage Northcutt in a lightweight bout at this event. However, on January 22, Holbrook was pulled out of the fight due to injury and was replaced by Bryan Barberena. The bout took place at welterweight.

On March 11, it was announced that Felipe Olivieri was notified of a potential anti-doping policy violation due to a positive test for methyltestosterone stemming from an out-of-competition sample in Brazil, before the event. Oliveiri stated he never used any illegal substance, and will ask for the B-sample to be tested.

Results

Bonus awards
The following fighters were awarded $50,000 bonuses:
Fight of the Night: Jimmie Rivera vs. Iuri Alcântara
Performance of the Night: Anthony Johnson and Ben Rothwell

See also
List of UFC events
2016 in UFC

References

Fox UFC
Events in Newark, New Jersey
Mixed martial arts in New Jersey
Sports competitions in Newark, New Jersey
2016 in mixed martial arts
January 2016 sports events in the United States